Van Loan is a surname. Notable people with the surname include:

 Carl Van Loan, Olympic skier
 Charles F. Van Loan, American mathematician
 Peter Van Loan (born 1963), Canadian politician

See also
 Van Loan Hill, a mountain in Greene County, New York
 Van Loon, the original spelling of the surname

Surnames of Dutch origin
Surnames
Dutch-language surnames